Bogatovsky District is an administrative and municipal district (raion), one of the twenty-seven in Samara Oblast, Russia. It is located in the east of the oblast. Its administrative center is the rural locality (a selo) of Bogatoye. As of the 2010 Census, the total population of the district was 14,142, with the population of Bogatoye accounting for 41.9% of that number.

References

Notes

Sources

Districts of Samara Oblast